Cophyla occultans is a species of frog in the family Microhylidae. It is found on Nosy Be, its type locality, and adjacent mainland in northeastern Madagascar, including Ambolokopatrika, Anjanaharibe-Sud, Manantenina, Marojejy, Sambava, and Voloina.

Cophyla occultans is an arboreal species living in rainforests. It can also occur in coffee plantations and bamboo growth where tree holes and bamboo are available.

References

Bibliography
 Glaw, F. and Vences, M. (1994). A Field Guide to the Amphibians and Reptiles of Madagascar. Vences & Glaw Verlag, Bonn.  
 Glaw, F., and Vences, M. (2007). Field Guide to the Amphibians and Reptiles of Madagascar. Third Edition. Vences and Glaw Verlag, Köln.

occultans
Endemic frogs of Madagascar
Amphibians described in 1992